Juan Alejandro Arcienego-Adams (born January 16, 1992) is an American mixed martial arts (MMA) fighter and currently competes in the heavyweight division. Adams formerly competed in the Ultimate Fighting Championship (UFC) and Professional Fighters League (PFL).

Background
Adams was born in Houston, Texas on January 16, 1992. He played football, competed in wrestling and was an Eagle Scout during his high school years. During his senior year at Strake Jesuit College Preparatory in Houston, Adams broke his hand and failed to get a collegiate football scholarship. Thus, he turned his focus to wrestling. He was offered  a scholarship from Virginia Military Institute in Lexington, Virginia. Upon graduation, he received NFL tryouts for a defensive linemen position from the Indianapolis Colts and Green Bay Packers, without success. Being 6-foot-5 and over 300 pounds, he turned his focus to MMA, since he had started training at Paradigm Training Center during his break from university in his hometown. Adams took his first amateur MMA fight after he graduated with a computer science degree. He won the fight and knew being a mixed martial artist would be his choice for his career.

Mixed martial arts career

Early career 
Adams began his professional MMA career in 2017 and fought in Legacy Fighting Alliance and amassed a record of 3-0 prior to competing in Dana White's Contender Series 15.

Dana White's Tuesday Night Contender Series 
Adams appeared in Dana White's Contender Series 15 on July 31, 2018, facing Shawn Teed. He won the fight via technical knockout in round one and was signed by UFC.

Ultimate Fighting Championship
Adams made his UFC debut on December 15, 2018 against Chris de la Rocha at UFC on Fox 31, He won the fight via technical knockout in round three.

His next fight was on May 4, 2019 at UFC Fight Night 151 against Arjan Bhullar. He lost the fight via unanimous decision.

Adams faced Greg Hardy on July 20, 2019 at UFC on ESPN 4. He lost the fight via technical knockout in round one.

Adams faced Justin Tafa on February 8, 2020 at UFC 247. He lost the fight via knockout in the first round.

On February 12, 2020, Adams revealed he had been released from the UFC. Later it was clarified that Adams fought out his rookie contract and it was not renewed.

Post-UFC career 
Adams signed with ARES Fighting Championship in late February 2020.

Despite the contract with ARES, Adams ended up facing Jeremy Hardy at Fury FC 46 on May 16, 2021. He won the fight via first-round technical knockout.

He was then scheduled to face Juan Torres at Fury FC 47 on June 20, 2021, but the fight was cancelled.

Adams faced Eric Lunsford at Fury FC 48 on July 25, 2021. He won the fight via first-round rear naked choke submission.

Fury FC Heavyweight Champion
Adams challenged Richard Odoms for the Fury FC Heavyweight Championship at Fury FC 49 on August 29, 2021, he won the fight by third round TKO.

Adams made a defence of his Fury FC Heavyweight Championship against Austen Lane at Fury FC 54 on November 21, 2021. He lost the bout and title via a 4th round TKO stoppage.

Adams faced Aaron Rosa at Fury FC 56 on February 6, 2022. Adams won the bout in the first round via ground and pound TKO.

Professional Fighters League
Adams faced Sam Kei on June 24, 2022 at PFL 5. He won the fight via TKO in the second round.

Adams, replacing Denis Goltsov, faced Matheus Scheffel in the Semifinals of the Heavyweight tournament on August 13, 2022 at PFL 8. Adams lost the bout via TKO stoppage in the third round.

Championships and accomplishments
Fury Fighting Championship
Fury FC Heavyweight Championship (one time; former)

Mixed martial arts record

|-
|Loss
|align=center|10–5
|Matheus Scheffel
|TKO (punches)
|PFL 8
|
|align=center|3
|align=center|3:45
|Cardiff, Wales
|
|-
|Win
|align=center|10–4
|Sam Kei
|TKO (punches)
|PFL 5
|
|align=center|2
|align=center|2:30
|Atlanta, Georgia, United States
|
|-
|Win
|align=center|9–4
|Aaron Rosa
|TKO (punches)
|Fury FC 56
|
|align=center| 1
|align=center| 3:08
|San Antonio, Texas, United States
|
|-
|Loss
|align=center|8–4
|Austen Lane
|TKO (punches)
|Fury FC 54
|
|align=center|4
|align=center|0:43
|Houston, Texas, United States
|
|-
|Win
|align=center|8–3
|Richard Odoms
|TKO (punches)
|Fury FC 49
|
|align=center|3
|align=center|5:00
|Houston, Texas, United States
|
|-
|Win
|align=center|7–3
|Eric Lunsford
|Submission (rear naked choke)
|Fury FC 48
|
|align=center|1
|align=center|3:27
|Houston, Texas, United States
|
|-
|Win
|align=center|6–3
|Jeremy Hardy
|TKO (punches)
|Fury FC 46
|
|align=center|1
|align=center|3:59
|Houston, Texas, United States
|
|-
|Loss
|align=center|5–3
|Justin Tafa
|TKO (punches) 
|UFC 247 
|
|align=center|1
|align=center|1:59
|Houston, Texas, United States
|
|-
|Loss
|align=center|5–2
|Greg Hardy
|TKO (punches)
|UFC on ESPN: dos Anjos vs. Edwards 
|
|align=center|1
|align=center|0:45
|San Antonio, Texas, United States
|
|-
|Loss
|align=center|5–1
|Arjan Bhullar
|Decision (unanimous)
|UFC Fight Night: Iaquinta vs. Cowboy
|
|align=center|3
|align=center|5:00
|Ottawa, Ontario, Canada
|
|-
|Win
|align=center|5–0
|Chris de la Rocha
|TKO (punches)
|UFC on Fox: Lee vs. Iaquinta 2
|
|align=center|3
|align=center|0:58
|Milwaukee, Wisconsin, United States
|
|-
|Win
|align=center|4–0
|Shawn Teed
|TKO (punches)
|Dana White's Contender Series 15
|
|align=center|1
|align=center|4:09
|Las Vegas, Nevada, United States
|
|-
|Win
|align=center|3–0
|Dwight Gipson
|TKO  (submission to punches)
|LFA 32
|
|align=center|1
|align=center|4:09
|Lake Charles, Louisiana, United States
|
|-
|Win
|align=center|2–0
|Brice Ritani-Coe
|TKO (punches)
|LFA 26
|
|align=center|1
|align=center|1:33
|Houston, Texas, United States
|
|-
|Win
|align=center|1–0
|Chris Rose
|TKO (punches)
|LFA 14
|
|align=center|1
|align=center|1:11
|Houston, Texas, United States
|
|-

See also
List of male mixed martial artists

References

External links
 
 

1992 births
Living people
Heavyweight mixed martial artists
Mixed martial artists utilizing collegiate wrestling
Mixed martial artists utilizing Brazilian jiu-jitsu
Sportspeople from Houston
American male mixed martial artists
American male sport wrestlers
VMI Keydets wrestlers
American practitioners of Brazilian jiu-jitsu
Ultimate Fighting Championship male fighters